Otto Benjamin Taylor Jr. (born August 21, 1967) is an American college basketball coach, currently head coach for Tuskegee. He is a former head men's basketball coach at Chicago State University and former interim head coach at the University of Hawaii.

Head coaching record

References

External links
 Tuskegee profile
 Hawaii profile

1967 births
Living people
American men's basketball coaches
American men's basketball players
Basketball coaches from North Carolina
Basketball players from North Carolina
Cal State Bakersfield Roadrunners men's basketball coaches
Chicago State Cougars men's basketball coaches
Cornell Big Red men's basketball coaches
Hawaii Rainbow Warriors basketball coaches
Indiana State Sycamores men's basketball coaches
Northern Illinois Huskies men's basketball coaches
Pepperdine Waves men's basketball coaches
Richmond Spiders men's basketball coaches
Richmond Spiders men's basketball players
Southeast Missouri State Redhawks men's basketball coaches
The Citadel Bulldogs basketball coaches
Tulane Green Wave men's basketball coaches
Tuskegee Golden Tigers men's basketball coaches